South Korea competed at the 2008 Asian Beach Games held in Bali, Indonesia from October 18, 2008 to October 26, 2008. South Korea finished with 4 gold medals, 7 silver medals, and 10 bronze medals.

Medal summary

Medal table

Medalists

References

Nations at the 2008 Asian Beach Games
2008
Asian Beach Games